Ye with macron (Е̄ е̄; italics: Е̄ е̄) is a letter of the Cyrillic script. In all its forms it looks exactly like the Latin letter E with macron (Ē ē Ē ē).

Ye with macron is used in the Aleut (Bering dialect), Evenki, Mansi, Nanai, Negidal, Orok, Kildin Sami, Selkup and Chechen languages.

Ye with macron also appears in some dialects of several South Slavic languages.

Computing codes
Being a relatively recent letter, not present in any legacy 8-bit Cyrillic encoding, the letter Е̄ is not represented directly by a precomposed character in Unicode either; it has to be composed as Е+◌̄ (U+0304).

Usage

South Slavic languages
Ye with macron is used some South Slavic languages, mainly in the Bulgarian language usually before or after another accented vowel so that the long syllables were skipped and the accent fell on the short vowel: дѐве̄р, грѐбе̄н, рѐпе̄й, and пѐпе̄л. It is also used in some Serbian texts in some words: дêве̄р.

See also
Ē ē : Latin letter Ē - a Latvian, Latgalian, Livonian, and Samogitian letter
Cyrillic characters in Unicode

References

Cyrillic letters with diacritics
Letters with macron